Listenable Records is an independent metal label originally founded in 1990 in France. The label specializes in metal, with a focus on extreme metal music.

The company has published albums from many acclaimed extreme metal bands, such as Immortal, My Dying Bride, Gojira, Aborted, Textures, and Immolation. The label has extended its catalog to more classic rock bands like Wolf Jaw, Imperial Jade, Jared James Nichols, and My Dynamite; they have also published albums for doom metal and stoner rock groups such as Mos Generator and Mars Red Sky.

Aspiring to be at the forefront of developing new talent from diverse musical backgrounds with dedication and enthusiasm, Listenable Records has become one of the most respected labels of international metal and hard rock.

Artists

Aaron Buchanan & The Cult Classics
Abhorrence
Aborted
Abscess
Adagio
Amaran
Ancient
Angtoria
Anorexia Nervosa
Armageddon
Betraying the Martyrs
Bloodjinn
Blind Dog
Centurian
Crescent (Egypt)
Crest of Darkness
Crisix
Crystal Viper

Demise
Deranged
Destructor
Devilyn
Diabolique
Divine Rapture
Exhumed
Gardenian
General Surgery
Gojira
Gorod
Grief of Emerald
Hacride
Hate
Hellish Outcast

Horned God
Immolation
Incantation
Jigsore Terror
Koldborn
Kruger
Luciferion
Lyzanxia
Mahatma
Marionette
Mors Principium Est
Mutant
Nail Within
Noctiferia
No Return

Non Human Level
Outcast
Psychedelic Witchcraft
Reclusion
Redshark
Sarah Jezebel Deva
Satan
Scarve
Skyclad
Soilwork
Solace
Speed/Kill/Hate
Submission
Svart Crown
Sybreed
Symbyosis
Textures

The Amenta
The Eyes of a Traitor
The Legion
The Omega Experiment
The Order of Apollyon
The Red Shore
Theory in Practice
Tyrant (Japanese band)
Triumphator
Ultra Vomit
VELD
Vile
Waylander
Zonaria

See also
 List of record labels

References

External links
 
 

French independent record labels
Death metal record labels